The 1937 Singapore Open, also known as the 1937 Singapore Badminton Championships, took place from 11 September – 24 October 1937 at the Clerical Union Hall in Balestier, Singapore. The ties were played over a few months with the first round ties being played on the 11th of September and the last two ties of the tournament were played on the 24th of October. There were no women's doubles and mixed doubles competition due to the lack of entries.

Venue
Clerical Union Hall

Final results

References 

Singapore Open (badminton)
1937 in badminton